Nijō Tamefuyu (二条為冬, ?–1335), also known as Fujiwara no Tamefuyu (藤原為冬), was a Japanese courtier and waka poet of the late Kamakura period.

He was briefly considered as a possible compiler for the Shokugoshūi Wakashū an imperial anthology of waka, but was opposed by his nephew Nijō Tamesada. Twenty of his poems were eventually included in this and later imperial anthologies, with more in private collections.

He died in 1335 fighting against the winning army of Ashikaga Takauji at the Battle of Takenoshita.

Biography

Ancestry and birth 
Tamefuyu's year of birth is unknown. He was the youngest child of Nijō Tameyo, Tameyo himself being a son of Nijō Tameuji, a grandson of Fujiwara no Tameie, and a great-grandson of Fujiwara no Teika.

Political career 
At the height of his political career, he held the position of Middle Captain of the Left (左中将).

Death 
He died on the twelfth day of the twelfth month of Kenmu 2 (1335/1336).

Name 
He was a member of the Nijō branch of the Fujiwara clan, so is known as both Nijō Tamefuyu and Fujiwara no Tamefuyu.

Poetry 
Tamefuyu participated in a number of formal waka poetry gatherings, including at the imperial palace, beginning around 1323, when he was present at the Kameyama-dono shichihyaku-shu (亀山殿七百首).

In the seventh month of 1324, when Nijō Tamefuji suddenly dropped out as a compiler of the Shokugoshūi Wakashū, his father Tameyo attempted to replace him with Tamefuyu, who was then probably only in his twenties, but was overruled by Nijō Tamesada.

20 of his poems are included in imperial collections from the Shokugoshūi Wakashū on. Several of his poems are also known from private collections (私撰集 shisenshū), such as the Shoku Gen'yō Wakashū (続現葉和歌集) and the Rin'ei Wakashū (臨詠和歌集). There is a work known as the Zen-sangi Tamefuyu-kyō Shū (前参議為冬卿集, literally "Former Councilor Tamefuyu Collection"), but despite its name this is actually a selection of poems taken from the Waka Dairin Gushō (和歌題林愚抄) rather than a personal anthology compiled by Tamefuyu himself.

References

Works cited 

 
 
 

Year of birth unknown
1335 deaths
Fujiwara clan
Nijō family
14th-century Japanese poets